CHOO-FM (99.5 MHz, Boom 99.5) is a radio station in Drumheller, Alberta. Owned by Stingray Group, it broadcasts a classic hits format.

History
The station was licensed by the CRTC in 2008, and officially launched at 8:00 AM MST on April 28, 2009 as 99.5 Drum FM.

The CHOO callsign was formerly used at a radio station, known today as CJKX-FM in Ajax, Ontario from 1967-1994 and at another station, (now defunct) in Tofino, British Columbia from 2000–2002. Both of these stations that used the CHOO callsign have no relation to the current CHOO-FM in Drumheller, Alberta.

On January 7, 2019, Stingray Group announced its intent to acquire CHOO-FM from Golden West Broadcasting; this would make it a sister to CKDQ. On August 28, 2019, CHOO flipped from adult contemporary to classic hits as Boom 99.5.

References

External links
 
  — news website operated by the station cluster.
 

HOO
HOO
HOO
Drumheller
Radio stations established in 2009
2009 establishments in Alberta